Argentala mesitana is a moth of the family Notodontidae first described by Paul Dognin in 1917. It is found along the western slope of the Colombian Andes.

References

Moths described in 1917
Notodontidae of South America